The Fossil Fuel Non-Proliferation Treaty Initiative is a civil society campaign to create a treaty to stop fossil fuel exploration and expansion and phase-out existing production in line with the targets of the Paris Climate Agreement, while supporting a just transition to renewable energy.

The treaty has been endorsed by the Vatican, the World Health Organization, the European Parliament, Nobel laureates, academics, researchers, activists, and a growing list of governments (municipal, subnational, national), and individual Parliamentarians.

The program includes the creation of a standalone Global Registry of Fossil Fuels to ensure transparency and accountability of production and reserves.

History
In 2015, Pacific Island leaders issued the "Suva Declaration On Climate Change" during the Pacific Islands Development Forum in Suva, Fiji. They called for "the implementation of an international moratorium on the development and expansion of fossil fuel extracting industries, particularly the construction of new coal mines, as an urgent step towards de-carbonising the global economy." The next year, in 2016, 14 Pacific Island nations continued to discuss the world's first "treaty" that would ban new coal mining and embrace the 1.5 °C goal set at the recent Paris climate talks.

In August 2017, a group of academics, activists, and analysts issued the Lofoten Declaration which stressed that climate policy and governance required a managed decline of fossil fuel production. The international manifesto called for fossil fuel divestment and phase-out of use with a just transition to a low-carbon economy. The declaration received the support of 744 organizations, spanning 76 countries and helped mobilize efforts for a global treaty on fossil fuel production. The government of Norway divested from exploration and production shortly afterward.

At the closing of United Nations Climate Change Conference, on 17 November 2017, the Democratic Republic of Ethiopia made a final statement on behalf of Least Developed Countries (LDC), which they stressed the need for "an increase in ambition by all countries to put us on track to limit the global temperature increase to 1.5 °C by strengthening our national contributions, managing a phase-out of fossil fuels, promoting renewable energy and implementing the most ambitious climate action."

A year later, on 23 October 2018, Peter Newell and Andrew Simms, academics at the University of Sussex, wrote an op-ed in The Guardian that renewed these public calls for a "treaty": This time they presented the treaty idea as a "Fossil Fuel Non-Proliferation Treaty." While the Intergovernmental Panel on Climate Change (IPCC) advised reducing carbon emissions 45% by 2030 to hold global temperature rise below 1.5 °C, global demand for coal, oil and gas has continued to grow. Newell and Simms noted that fossil fuels accounted for 81% of energy use in 2018 with forecasts, including those by the International Energy Agency, anticipating greater demand in future decades. As a historical precedent for a fossil fuel non-proliferation treaty, Newell and Simms cited the Toronto Conference on the Changing Atmosphere in 1988, where the threat of "climatic upheaval" was compared "second only to nuclear war"—a sentiment endorsed at the time by the CIA, MI5, United Nations. In 2019 and 2020, Newell and Simms continued to write and publish on the Treaty in non-specialist news and academic journals.

Launch
The Fossil Fuel Non-Proliferation Treaty Initiative officially launched at Climate Week NYC on September 25, 2020, at an event called "International Cooperation to Align Fossil Fuel Production with a 1.5°C World."

Tzeporah Berman, a Canadian environmental activist, was named the chair of the Treaty Initiative, and Alex Rafalowicz, the director of the Treaty Initiative. Berman has argued that by "explicitly addressing the supply side of the climate crisis, the Fossil Fuel Non-Proliferation Treaty offers a way for countries to shift course." Berman has since argued that the Treaty would be a more genuine and realistic way to achieve the goals of the Paris Agreement than the "net zero" approach which, she claimed, is "delusional and based on bad science." As Rafalowicz has put it, the "Treaty aims to be a complementary mechanism to the Paris Agreement by directly addressing the fossil fuel industry and putting the just transition at its core." "The hope many academics, researchers, and activists have is that an international agreement to prevent the expansion of fossil fuels, to manage a fair global phase-out, and to guide a just transition could be used to preserve a planet that can support human life." "The Treaty aims to be a complementary mechanism to the Paris Agreement by directly addressing the fossil fuel industry and putting the just transition at its core," according to Rafalowicz.

Letter to World Leaders

On 21 April 2021, the Treaty Initiative coordinated a letter signed by 100 Nobel laureates, including scientists, peace makers, writers, and the Dalai Lama, urging world leaders "to take concrete steps to phase out fossil fuels in order to prevent catastrophic climate change."

The open letter referenced the importance of both the United Nations Framework Convention on Climate Change and the 2015 Paris Agreement which aims to limit global warming to "well below" 2 °C and, ideally, restrict any rise to 1.5 °C, compared to pre-industrial levels. It noted that failure to meet the 1.5 °C target would risk "pushing the world towards catastrophic global warming." It also added that the Paris Agreement makes no mention of oil, gas or coal. The letter highlighted a report from the United Nations Environment Programme, stating that "120% more coal, oil, and gas will be produced by 2030 than is consistent with limiting warming to 1.5°C."

The letter concluded that the expansion of the fossil fuel industry "is unconscionable ... The fossil fuel system is global and requires a global solution—a solution the Leaders' Climate Summit must work towards. And the first step is to keep fossil fuels in the ground."

The open letter, published a day before U.S. President Joe Biden hosted the virtual 2021 Leaders' Climate Summit with leaders from various countries, described the burning of fossil fuels as "by far the major contributor to climate change."

Alongside the Dalai Lama, signatories to the letter included Jody Williams, the International Campaign to Ban Landmines' founding coordinator; the economist Christopher Pissarides; Shirin Ebadi, the first female judge in Iran; and former Colombian President Juan Manuel Santos. Other names included Liberian peace activist and advocate for women's rights, Leymah Gbowee, and Wole Soyinka, the Nigerian playwright, novelist and poet.

Global registry of fossil fuels

In February 2021, Carbon Tracker, a UK-based think tank, and Global Energy Monitor, a US-based research organization, announced the creation of an independent and standalone Global Registry of Fossil Fuels. The Registry is supported by the Treaty as an important step in ensuring transparency and accountability in fossil fuel production and reserves.

Mark Campanale, the founder and executive director of Carbon Tracker, wrote in the Financial Times that the registry "will allow governments, investors, researchers and civil society organisations, including the public, to assess the amount of embedded CO2 in coal, oil and gas projects globally. It will be a standalone tool and can provide a model for a potential UN-hosted registry."

At the 2021 United Nations Climate Change Conference, Ted Nace, executive director of Global Energy Monitor, said "The development of this dataset is the first step in a virtuous circle of transparency. The more the inventory of carbon in the ground advances, the more useful it will become and the greater the pressure on countries and companies for full transparency."

Prospective Role in International Agreements
On Jan 31, 2023, journalist Gaye Taylor reported that, "ten years after Ecuador abandoned efforts to get the international community to pay it not to drill for oil in a corner of Yasuní National Park, one of the most biodiverse places on Earth, the cash-strapped country’s decision to double down on fossil exploration is signalling the need for a global fossil fuel non-proliferation agreement." A reassessment of that abandoned Yasuní-ITT Initiative points to the broader issue of how the Fossil Fuel Non-proliferation Treaty could be built and implemented as an international agreement and a compliance mechanism for a more fair fossil fuel phase-out.

United Nations Climate Change Conferences

2021
On 11 November, at the 2021 United Nations Climate Change Conference, "a group of young climate activists delivered a sharp rebuke to delegates at the COP26 climate summit...demanding that a fossil fuel non-proliferation treaty be put in place and calling out global leaders for their continued closeness to the coal, oil and gas industries...The activists did not mince their words when they took over the stage at the Glasgow conference, pointing out the absurdity of the fact that the very mentioning of "fossil fuels" in the meeting's agreement has become a sticking point. No COP agreement has ever mentioned fossil fuels as the main driver of the climate crisis.... The youth and the leaders of the Fridays for Future group [had] joined the already established Fossil Fuel Non-Proliferation Treaty Initiative, a network of civil society organizations pushing for a speedy and just phaseout of fossil fuels."

2022

At the 2022 United Nations Climate Change Conference Vanuatu and Tuvalu became the first countries to endorse a fossil fuel non proliferation treaty. Tuvalu's Prime Minister Kausea Natano in his speech stated “We all know that the leading cause of climate crisis is fossil fuels”, “ we have joined Vanuatu and other nations calling for a fossil fuels non-proliferation treaty… It’s getting too hot and there is very (little) time to slow and reverse the increasing temperature. Therefore, it is essential to prioritize fast acting strategies that avoids the most warming.”

Endorsements
As of February 11, 2022, the initiative "has been supported by 101 Nobel Laureates, 2,600 academics, 170 parliamentarians, hundreds of prominent youth leaders, a growing group of faith leaders, and more than 1,300 civil society organisations, including Catalyst 2030, Limaatzuster, Citizens' Climate Europe, Both Ends and Fridays for Future Leeuwarden."

On July 21, 2022, the treaty was endorsed by the Vatican. On September 14, 2022, the World Health Organization, along with nearly 200 other health organizations endorsed the treaty. On October 20, 2022, the European Parliament endorsed the initiative.

As of November 17, 2022, "Seventy cities and subnational governments worldwide have...signed on to support the treaty."

Scientists and academics
As of September 14, 2021, the Fossil Fuel Non-Proliferation Treaty Initiative has received the endorsement of 2,185 scientists and researchers from 81 countries.

Cities

Sub-national regional governments

National governments

Multi-National Organizations

See also

 Powering Past Coal Alliance
Fossil fuel phase-out
 Special Report on Global Warming of 1.5 °C
 Treaty on the Non-Proliferation of Nuclear Weapons

References

External links 
 Fossil Fuel Non-Proliferation Treaty Initiative - Official website
 Research and Publications associated with the Fossil Fuel Non-Proliferation Treaty Initiative
 Legislators, Parliamentarians and other individual elected officials call for a fossil fuel free future (also under "About" at the Fossil Fuel Non-Proliferation Treaty Initiative website)

International climate change organizations
Proposed treaties
14th Dalai Lama
Climate change mitigation
Climate change policy
Emissions reduction
Energy policy